Jim Chalmers is a Queensland politician and member of the Australian House of Representatives since 2013.

Jim Chalmers may also refer to:

 Jim Chalmers (New South Wales politician) (1901–1986), member of the New South Wales Legislative Assembly from 1947 to 1956
 Jimmy Chalmers (1877–1915), Scottish footballer

See also 
 James Chalmers (disambiguation)